Maksym Bursak (born 3 July 1984) is a Ukrainian professional boxer. He held the European middleweight title in 2013, and has challenged once for the WBO super-middleweight title in 2017.

Professional career
Bursak made his professional debut on 16 June 2004 against Viacheslav Kusov, who also debuted. Their fight ended in a four-round points draw. For the next eight years Bursak would remain undefeated, scoring wins over perennial middleweight contender Brian Vera and future world champion Giovanni De Carolis. Bursak fought for his first major world championship—the vacant WBO interim title—against Hassan N'Dam N'Jikam on 4 May 2012, but lost via wide unanimous decision (UD).

On 2 February 2013, Bursak stopped Julien Marie Sainte in three rounds to become the European middleweight champion. He made one defence of the title on 13 July 2013, scoring a UD over Prince Arron. After vacating the title, Bursak next fought Nick Blackwell on 21 September 2013. Despite being knocked down in round four, Bursak won a disputed twelve-round UD.

2014 would be less successful for Bursak: on 1 February he lost a twelve-round UD to Jarrod Fletcher, which was followed by another UD loss to Martin Murray on 21 June; in the latter fight, the vacant WBC Silver middleweight title was on the line. A second opportunity for Bursak to win a world championship—the vacant IBO super-middleweight title–came on 27 June 2015, against Zac Dunn. Having travelled far away to Australia from his native Ukraine, Bursak lost via UD.

Professional boxing record

References

External links

Middleweight boxers
Super-middleweight boxers
Living people
1984 births
Sportspeople from Kyiv
Ukrainian male boxers
European Boxing Union champions